Desikan is an Indian surname. Notable people with the surname include:

Lakshmi Kumara Thathachariar (Lakshmi Kumara Thatha Desikan; 1456–1543), Hindu saint and guru 
Rahul Desikan, Indian-American neuroscientist
Vedanta Desikan (1268–1369), Indian guru and philosopher

Hindu surnames